Melocanna baccifera is one of two bamboo species belonging to the Melocanna genus. It grows up to 10–25 m tall. It is native to Bangladesh, Myanmar, India, and Thailand.

Habit
It is tall, small-culmed bamboo with greenish young culms and straw-colored old culms. It grows in clumps composed of many well-spaced culms. It has a dense appearance due to its branching habit.

Description
Culms are greenish when young, but becomes straw-colored when mature or brownish green when drying. Young culms are covered with stiff, silver hairs. A white bloom occurs just below the nodes. Young shoots are yellowish brown. The culms are straight; branching occurs from the base, and branches are many, short, loose, and open. Internode length is 25–50 cm, and diameter is 1.5–15 cm. Culm walls are thin. Nodes are prominent.

Culm sheaths are greenish in young plants, and turn brown when mature.  The sheath proper is 7–15 cm long and  2.5–15 cm wide. Blade length is 10–30 cm. The auricles are equal. The upper surface of the sheath is covered with white hairs or may not. The lower surface of the sheath is not hairy. Sheaths do not fall off, only blades fall off.

Flowering
Melocanna baccifera flowers almost fully synchronically every 48 years. verified bloomings having occured in 1863, 1911, 1959, and 2007 with a precission exceeded only by Strobilanthus kuntghianus This flowering results in the phenomenon known as Mautam: the population of black rats burgeons owing to the plentiful food supply provided by the bamboo fruit (up to 80 tons/hectare), and once this is exhausted, famine follows as the rats move on to consume local crops, notably in the Northeast Indian state of Mizoram. The Jawaharlal Nehru Tropical Botanic Garden and Research Institute (JNTBGRI) Thiruvananthapuram
conducted the study for 13 years between 2009 and 2022 on the flowering of Melocanna baccifera and its relation to the occurrence of 'rat floods' Another peculiarity of M. baccifera is that, like Rhizophora spp, its seeds can germinate while still attached to the mother plant, so that they drop to the ground as plantlets.
'bamboo death and famines in northeast India. Researchers have reported the highest ever fruit production of 456.67 kg  in the bamboo clump.

Research publication
A paper on the findings has appeared in the journal PLOS One on November 16,2022. It was presumed earlier that the high protein in the fruits/seeds was attracting the rats. However the study conducted by JNTBGRI in 2016 found that the fruit actually contained very little protein and that the predation is mainly due to the high content of sugar. The research findings are of K.C Koshy, B. Gopakumar, Anthony Sebastian, Ajikumaran Nair S , Anil John Johnson, Balaji Govindan and B Sabulal. The flowering pattern and fruit production discovered through this study will be helpful to the foresters and people involved in the conservation of this bamboo.

References

Bambusoideae
Flora of Assam (region)
Flora of East Himalaya
Flora of Bangladesh
Flora of Myanmar
Flora of Thailand